Bulinus canescens is a species of freshwater snail, a gastropod in the Bulinidae family.

Distribution
It is found in Angola, the Democratic Republic of the Congo, and Zambia.

References

 Morelet, A., 1868 Mollusques terrestres et fluviatiles. In: Voyage du Dr. Friederich Welwitsch exécuté par ordre du gourvernement portugais dans les royaumes d'Angola et de Benguela, p. 102 pp
 Breure, A. S. H., Audibert, C., Ablett, J. D. (2018). Pierre Marie Arthur Morelet (1809-1892) and his contributions to malacology. Leiden: Nederlandse Malacologische Vereniging. 544 pp.

Bulinus
Gastropods described in 1868
Taxonomy articles created by Polbot